Jack Combs is an American television producer. He is best known for producing television documentaries.

Combs was the unit manager for the 1996 award-winning television documentary series The Great War and the Shaping of the 20th Century.

Filmography as a producer
The American Experience –  one episode (2000)
Chasing the Sun –  four episodes (2001)
Kingdom of David: The Saga of the Israelites (2003)
When Worlds Collide (2010)

References

External links
 

Year of birth missing (living people)
Living people
American television producers